Regulatory economics is the application of law by government or regulatory agencies for various economics-related purposes, including remedying market failure, protecting the environment and economic management.

Regulation

Regulation is generally defined as legislation imposed by a government on individuals and private sector firms in order to regulate and modify economic behaviors. Conflict can occur between public services and commercial procedures (e.g. maximizing profit), the interests of the people using these services (see market failure), and also the interests of those not directly involved in transactions (externalities). Most governments, therefore, have some form of control or regulation to manage these possible conflicts. The ideal goal of economic regulation is to ensure the delivery of a safe and appropriate service, while not discouraging the effective functioning and development of businesses.

For example, in most countries, regulation controls the sale and consumption of alcohol and prescription drugs, as well as the food business, provision of personal or residential care, public transport, construction, film and TV, etc. Monopolies, especially those that are difficult to abolish (natural monopoly), are often regulated. The financial sector is also highly regulated.

Regulation can have several elements:
 Public statutes, standards, or statements of expectations;
 A registration or licensing process to approve and permit the operation of a service, usually by a named organization or person;
 An inspection process or other form of ensuring standard compliance, including reporting and management of non-compliance with these standards; or
 The setting of price controls in the form of price-cap regulation or rate-of-return regulation, especially for natural monopolies.
Where there is non-compliance, this can result in:
 Financial penalties; or
 A de-licensing process through which an organization or person, if judged to be operating unsafely, is ordered to stop or suffer a penalty.

Not all types of regulation are government-mandated, so some professional industries and corporations choose to adopt self-regulating models. There can be internal regulation measures within a company, which work towards the mutual benefit of all members. Often, voluntary self-regulation is imposed in order to maintain professionalism, ethics, and industry standards.

For example, when a broker purchases a seat on the New York Stock Exchange, there are explicit rules of conduct, or contractual and agreed-upon conditions, to which the broker must conform. The coercive regulations of the U.S. Securities and Exchange Commission are imposed without regard for any individual's consent or dissent regarding that particular trade. However, in a democracy, there is still collective agreement on the constraint—the body politic as a whole agrees, through its representatives, and imposes the agreement on those participating in the regulated activity.

Other examples of voluntary compliance in structured settings include the activities of Major League Baseball, FIFA, and the Royal Yachting Association (the UK's recognized national association for sailing). Regulation in this sense approaches the ideal of an accepted standard of ethics for a given activity to promote the best interests of those participating as well as the continuation of the activity itself within specified limits.

In America, throughout the 18th and 19th centuries, the government engaged in substantial regulation of the economy. In the 18th century, the production and distribution of goods were regulated by British government ministries over the American Colonies (see mercantilism). Subsidies were granted to agriculture, and tariffs were imposed, sparking the American Revolution. The United States government maintained a high tariff throughout the 19th century and into the 20th century until the Reciprocal Tariff Act was passed in 1934 under the Franklin D. Roosevelt administration. However, regulation and deregulation came in waves, with the deregulation of big business in the Gilded Age leading to President Theodore Roosevelt's trust busting from 1901 to 1909, deregulation and Laissez-Faire economics once again in the roaring 1920s leading to the Great Depression, and intense governmental regulation and Keynesian economics under Franklin Roosevelt's New Deal plan. President Ronald Reagan deregulated business in the 1980s with his Reaganomics plan.

In 1946, the U.S. Congress enacted the Administrative Procedure Act (APA), which formalized means of ensuring the regularity of government administrative activity and its conformance with authorizing legislation. The APA established uniform procedures for a federal agency's promulgation of regulations and adjudication of claims. The APA also sets forth the process for judicial review of agency action.

Regulatory capture

Regulatory capture is the process through which a regulatory agency, created to act in the public interest, instead advances the commercial or special concerns of interest groups that dominate the industry it is meant to  regulate. The probability of regulatory capture is economically biased: vested interests in an industry have the greatest financial stake in regulatory activity and are more likely to be motivated to influence the regulatory body than dispersed individual consumers, each of whom has little particular incentive to try to influence regulators. Regulatory capture is a risk to which an agency is exposed by its very nature.

Theories of regulation
The art of regulation has long been studied, particularly in the utilities sector. Two ideas have been formed on regulatory policy: positive theories of regulation and normative theories of regulation.

The former examine why regulation occurs. These theories include theories of market power, "interest group theories that describe stakeholders' interests in regulation," and "theories of government opportunism that describe why restrictions on government discretion may be necessary for the sector to provide efficient services for customers." These theories conclude that regulation occurs because: 
 the government is interested in overcoming *information asymmetries and in aligning their own interest with the operator,
 customers desire protection from market power in the presence of non-existent or ineffective competition,
 operators desire protection from rivals, or
 operators desire protection from government opportunism.

Normative economic theories of regulation generally conclude that regulators should 
 encourage competition where feasible,
 minimize information asymmetry costs by gathering information and incentivizing operators to improve their performance,
 provide for economically efficient price structures, and
 establish regulatory processes that provide for "regulation under the law and independence, transparency, predictability, legitimacy, and credibility for the regulatory system."

Alternatively, many heterodox economists and legal scholars stress the importance of market regulation for "safeguarding against monopoly formation, the overall stability of markets, environmental harm, and to ensure a variety of social protections." These draw on sociologists (such as Max Weber, Karl Polanyi, Neil Fligstein, and Karl Marx) and the history of government institutions partaking in regulatory processes. "To allow the market mechanism to be sole director of the fate of human beings and their natural environment, indeed, even of the amount and use of purchasing power, would result in the demolition of society."

*Information asymmetry deals with transactions in which one party has more information than the other, which creates an imbalance in power that at the worst can cause a kind of market failure. They are most commonly studied in the context of principal-agent problems.

Principal-agent theory addresses issues of information asymmetry. Here, the government is the principal, and the operator the agent, regardless of who owns the operator. Principal-agent theory is applied in incentive regulation and multi-part tariffs.

Regulatory metrics 
The World Bank's Doing Business database collects data from 178 countries on the costs of regulation in certain areas, such as starting a business, employing workers, getting credit, and paying taxes. For example, it takes an average of 19 working days to start a business in the OECD, compared to 60 in Sub-Saharan Africa; the cost as a percentage of GNP (not including bribes) is 8% in the OECD, and 225% in Africa.

The Worldwide Governance Indicators project at the World Bank recognizes that regulations have a significant impact in the quality of governance of a country. The Regulatory Quality of a country, defined as "the ability of the government to formulate and implement sound policies and regulations that permit and promote private sector development" is one of the six dimensions of governance that the Worldwide Governance Indicators measure for more than 200 countries.

Deregulation

In modern American politics
Overly complicated regulatory law, increasing inflation, concern over regulatory capture, and outdated transportation regulations made deregulation an appealing idea in the US in the late 1970s. During his presidency (1977-1981), President Jimmy Carter introduced sweeping deregulation reform of the financial system (by the removal of interest rate ceilings) and the transportation industry, allowing the airline industry to operate more freely.

President Ronald Reagan took up the mantle of deregulation during his two terms in office (1981-1989) and expanded upon it with the introduction of Reaganomics, which sought to stimulate the economy through income and corporate tax cuts coupled with deregulation and reduced government spending. Though favored by industry, Reagan-era economic policies concerning deregulation are regarded by many economists as having contributed  to the Savings and Loan Crisis of the late 1980s and 1990s.

The allure of free market capitalism remains present in American politics today, with many economists recognizing the importance of finding balance between the inherent risks associated with investment and the safeguards of regulation. Some, particularly members of industry, feel that lingering regulations imposed after the financial crisis of 2007 such as the Dodd-Frank financial reform act are too stringent and impede economic growth, especially among small businesses. Others support continued regulation on the basis that deregulation of the financial sector led to the 2007 financial crisis and that regulations lend stability to the economy.

In 2017, President Donald Trump signed an executive order that he claimed would "knock out two regulations for every new regulation." Trump made the claim: "Every regulation should have to pass a simple test. Does it make life better or safer for American workers or consumers? If the answer is no, we will be getting rid of it."

Counterparts
A common counterpart of deregulation is the privatization of state-run industries. The goal of privatization is for market forces to increase the efficiency of denationalized industries. Privatization was widely pursued in Great Britain throughout Margaret Thatcher's administration. Though largely considered a success and considerably reducing government deficit, critics argue that standards, wages, and employment declined due to privatization. Others point out that lack of careful regulations on some of the privatized industries is a source of continued problems.

Controversy

Proponents
The regulation of markets is to safeguard society and has been the mainstay of industrialized capitalist economic governance through the twentieth century.  Karl Polanyi refers to this process as the 'embedding' of markets in society.  Further, contemporary economic sociologists such as Neil Fligstein (in his 2001 Architecture of Markets) argue that markets depend on state regulation for their stability, resulting in a long term co-evolution of the state and markets in capitalist societies in the last two hundred years.

Opponents
 This position is alternatively summarized in what is known as the Iron Law of Regulation, which states that all government regulation eventually leads to a net loss in social welfare.

Some argue that companies are incentivized to behave in a socially responsible manner, therefore eliminating the need for external regulation, by their commitment to stakeholders, their interest in preserving reputability, and their goals for long term growth.

See also
 Economic interventionism
 
 Administrative law
 Averch-Johnson effect
 Banded forbearance
 Constitutional economics
 Rule according to higher law
 Deregulation
 Trust-busting
 Liberalization
 Price-cap regulation
 Natural monopoly
 Public choice theory
 Regulated market
 Regulation
 Regulation school
 Worldwide Governance Indicators

References

Further reading 
 Cebula, R., & Clark, J. (2014). Economic Freedom, Regulatory Quality, Taxation, and Living Standards, MPRA Paper 58108, University Library of Munich, Germany.
 Journal of Regulatory Economics (1989– ) 
 Posner, R. A. 1974 “ Theories of Regulation”,  Bell Journal of Economics and Management Science, 25 (1), Spring, pp. 335–373
Stigler, J. G. 1971, "The Theory of Economic Regulation," Bell Journal of Management Science, 2 (1), Spring, pp. 3–21
Peltzman, S. 1989 "The Economic Theory of Regulation after a Decade of Deregulation," Brookings Papers on Economic Activity: Microeconomics, pp. 1 –41
 Laffont, J. J., & Tirole, J. (1993). A theory of incentives in procurement and regulation. MIT press.

External links

World Bank "Doing Business project"
Worldwide Governance Indicators Worldwide ratings of country performances on Regulatory Quality and other governance dimensions from 1996 to present.

Monopoly (economics)
 
Market structure
Public choice theory